Dominik Soltész (born 29 November 2000) is a Hungarian football midfielder who plays for Gyirmót.

Career statistics

References

External links
 
 

2000 births
Footballers from Budapest
Living people
Hungarian footballers
Hungary under-21 international footballers
Association football midfielders
Budapest Honvéd FC players
FC Ajka players
Debreceni VSC players
Gyirmót FC Győr players
Nemzeti Bajnokság I players
Nemzeti Bajnokság II players